The Parliamentary Democracy Party (PDP) is a Burmese political party established in August 1969 by the exiled prime minister U Nu.

U Nu, exiled to Thailand, worked with the former newspaper editor Edward Law Yone and four members of the Thirty Comrades to set up the PDP. Its armed wing, the Patriotic Liberation Army, unsuccessfully attempted insurgency along the border between Thailand and Burma. In 1970, with covert CIA backing, the party tried to establish a united front, known as the National United Front, together with the Karen National Union, the Chin Democracy Party and the New Mon State Army. However, the NUF faced financial difficulties and political disagreement between its different ethnic constituencies. After U Nu resigned the PDP's presidency and moved to India in 1973, the movement collapsed.

References

Rebel groups in Myanmar
Political parties in Myanmar
Political parties established in 1969